Ulduz Sultanov (born 7 April 1974) is an Azerbaijani judoka.

Achievements

References

1974 births
Living people
Azerbaijani male judoka
Place of birth missing (living people)